ACSA - Air Century, S.A. (ACSA for short) is a Dominican Republic air charter operator that offers local and international services from the Santo Domingo La Isabela International Airport. The company was founded by Captain and Pilot Omar Chahin. Air Century commenced operations in Santo Domingo in March 1992.

Its corporate head office is at the La Isabela International Airport in Santo Domingo.

This airline offers charter flights and other services through the Dominican Republic, the Caribbean, South America, and North America.

Scheduled destinations
Air Century operates schedule flights to the following destinations:

Fleet

Air Century's fleet consists of the following aircraft (as of December 2022):

Accidents and incidents
On 13 October 2014, a British Aerospace Jetstream 32 (HI816) was destroyed by fire at Punta Cana after an engine failure on short final, after a flight from Luis Muñoz Marín International Airport in San Juan, Puerto Rico. All 13 passengers and two flight crew on board survived the fire.

See also
List of airlines of the Dominican Republic

External links

Air Century
Air Century (archive)
Air Century 
Air Charter Guide
Dominican Aviation
Air Century at STI

References

Airlines of the Dominican Republic
Airlines established in 1991
1991 establishments in the Dominican Republic
Brands of the Dominican Republic